Gabriel Iván Mercado (born 18 March 1987) is an Argentine professional footballer who plays for Internacional. Mainly a right back, he could also play as a central defender.

He began his career with Racing Club and Estudiantes before joining River Plate in 2012, going on to win six domestic and international tournaments including the 2015 Copa Libertadores. In 2016, he joined Sevilla for €2.5 million.

Mercado made his international debut for Argentina in 2010, and was part of their squad that came runners-up at the Copa América Centenario, and also took part at the 2018 FIFA World Cup.

Club career

Early career
Born in Puerto Madryn, Chubut, Mercado made his professional debut for Racing Club on 21 February 2007 in a 0–1 home defeat to San Lorenzo. He went to establish himself as a regular member of the Racing first team.

In July 2010, Mercado joined Estudiantes de La Plata for $800,000 and 50% of his rights. He won the Apertura in his debut season, and stayed at the club until 2012.

In July 2012, he signed for River Plate.

Sevilla
On 4 August 2016, La Liga side Sevilla FC signed Mercado from River Plate on a three-year deal for a reported fee of €2.5 million, with River retaining 20% of a subsequent transfer fee. He was signed by compatriot manager Jorge Sampaoli to replace former captain Coke.

He scored his first goal for the team on 20 September, deflecting Samir Nasri's free kick for the only score in a home Seville derby win over Real Betis.

Al-Rayyan
On 11 June 2019, Al-Rayyan SC announced via their social media that they had signed Mercado.

Internacional
On 5 July 2021, he was announced and signed with Internacional until December 2022 after being without a club at the end of his contract with Al-Rayyan. His chosen jersey number was jersey number 25.

International career

Youth career
Mercado represented the Argentina Under-20 team at the 2007 South American Youth Championship in Paraguay and at the 2007 FIFA U-20 World Cup in Canada.

Senior career
Mercado made his full international debut for the Argentina national team after being called up to join Diego Maradona's squad of Argentina-based players who beat Jamaica 2–1 on 10 February 2010.

Mercado was first-choice in his position for Argentina in the 2016 Copa América Centenario squad, playing in the final against Chile for the full 120-minutes, a 4–2 loss on penalties.

In May 2018, Mercado was named in Argentina's preliminary 35-man squad for the 2018 FIFA World Cup in Russia; later that month, he was included in Jorge Sampaoli's final 23-man squad for the tournament. In the round of 16 match against France on 30 June, Mercado scored in a 4–3 defeat, which saw Argentina eliminated from the competition.

Career statistics

International

Scores and results list Argentina's goal tally first

Honours
Estudiantes
Argentine Primera División: 2010 Apertura

River Plate
Argentine Primera División: Torneo Final 2014
Copa Campeonato: 2013–14
Copa Sudamericana: 2014
Recopa Sudamericana: 2015
Copa Libertadores: 2015
Copa Suruga Bank: 2015
Copa Argentina: 2016

Argentina
FIFA U-20 World Cup: 2007
Copa América runner-up: 2016
Superclásico de las Américas: 2017

References

External links

Gabriel Mercado – Argentine Primera statistics at Fútbol XXI 

Gabriel Mercado at Football Lineups

1987 births
Living people
People from Puerto Madryn
Argentine footballers
Argentina international footballers
Argentina under-20 international footballers
Association football defenders
Argentine Primera División players
La Liga players
Qatar Stars League players
Campeonato Brasileiro Série A players
Racing Club de Avellaneda footballers
Estudiantes de La Plata footballers
Club Atlético River Plate footballers
Sevilla FC players
Al-Rayyan SC players
Sport Club Internacional players
Copa América Centenario players
Argentine expatriate footballers
Expatriate footballers in Spain
Argentine expatriate sportspeople in Spain
Expatriate footballers in Qatar
Argentine expatriate sportspeople in Qatar
2018 FIFA World Cup players